Charles Ferraro (born November 6, 1952) is an American politician who has served in the Connecticut House of Representatives from the 117th district since 2015. He also serves as Grandmaster of the Tang Soo Do Mi Guk Kwan federation.

References

1952 births
Living people
21st-century American politicians
Republican Party members of the Connecticut House of Representatives